Séverine Beltrame and Julie Coin were the defending champions, having won the event in 2012, but Beltrame had announced her retirement from professional tennis in June 2013. Coin partnered up with Ana Vrljić as the third seeds.

Coin and Vrljić won the tournament, defeating first seeds Andrea Hlaváčková and Michaëlla Krajicek in the final, 6–3, 4–6, [15–13].

Seeds

Draw

References 
 Draw

Open Gdf Suez de Touraine - Doubles